was a Japanese art director, costume designer, and graphic designer known for her work in stage, screen, advertising, and print media.

Noted for her advertising campaigns for the Japanese boutique chain Parco, she collaborated with sportswear company Descente in designing uniforms and outerwear for members of the Swiss, Canadian, Japanese, and Spanish teams at the 2002 Winter Olympics in Salt Lake City and was the director of costume design for the opening ceremony of the 2008 Summer Olympics in Beijing. She won the Academy Award for Best Costume Design for her work in Francis Ford Coppola's 1992 romantic-horror film Bram Stoker's Dracula which was based on the novel of the same name and was posthumously nominated for an Academy Award in the same category for her work in Tarsem Singh's 2012 film Mirror Mirror.

Life and career
 was born in Tokyo to a commercial graphic designer father and a housewife mother. Although her father encouraged her interest in art as a child, he discouraged her desire to follow him into the business. She graduated from the Tokyo National University of Fine Arts and Music. As director of costume design for opening ceremony of 2008 Beijing Olympics,  found inspiration from art pieces such as Greek statues and African helmets. As a result, a large number of costumes that are able to visualize fabric texture, actions, and aura were designed under her hands.

Advertising career 
 began her career with the advertising division of the cosmetics company  in 1961 and won Japan's most prestigious advertising award four years later.  was discovered by  who created Parco  from the ailing  Department Store. When Parco did well and expanded to a  location in 1973,  designed Parco 's first 15-second commercial for the grand opening with "a tall, thin black woman, dressed in a black bikini, dancing with a very small man in a Santa Claus outfit". She became deeply involved in Parco's image. Her last Parco campaign involved Faye Dunaway as "face of Parco" wearing black, on a black chair against a black wall, and peeling and eating an egg in one minute as "a film for Parco." She became its chief art director in 1971 and her work there is noted for several campaigns featuring Faye Dunaway and for its open and surreal eroticism. In 1983 she ended her association with Parco and opened her own design firm.

In 2003, she designed the logo for the Houston Rockets.

Film career 
In 1985 director Paul Schrader chose  to be the production designer for his 1985 film Mishima: A Life in Four Chapters. Her work went on to win her a special award for artistic contribution at the Cannes Film Festival that year. 's work with Francis Ford Coppola on the poster for the Japanese release of Apocalypse Now led to their later collaboration in Coppola's Dracula, which earned  an Academy Award.  also worked on four of Tarsem Singh's films, beginning with the Jennifer Lopez starrer The Cell in 2000 and including The Fall, Immortals, and Mirror Mirror.

 also designed costumes for theater and the circus. In 1999 she designed costumes for Richard Wagner's Der Ring des Nibelungen at the Dutch Opera. She designed costumes for Cirque du Soleil: Varekai, which premiered in 2002 as well as for Julie Taymor's Broadway musical Spider-Man: Turn Off the Dark, which premiered in 2011. She also directed the music video for Björk's "Cocoon" in 2002 and designed costumes for the "Hurricane" tour of singer Grace Jones in 2009.

's work is included in the permanent collection of museums throughout the world, including the Museum of Modern Art in New York.

Awards 
 won a Grammy Award for Best Recording Package for her artwork for Miles Davis's album Tutu in 1987 and an Academy Award for Best Costume Design for Bram Stoker's Dracula in 1992. She also received two Tony Award nominations in 1988 for the stage and costume design of the Broadway play M. Butterfly. In 2012, she was nominated for an Academy Award for Best Costume Design for Mirror Mirror and won the Costume Designers Guild Award for Excellence In Fantasy Film. In 1992 she was selected to be a member of the New York Art Directors Club Hall of Fame. On July 12, 2017, she was honored with a Google Doodle.

Filmography 
Mishima: A Life in Four Chapters (1985)
Closet Land (1991)
Bram Stoker's Dracula (1992)
The Cell (2000)
The Fall (2006)
Theresa: The Body of Christ (2007)
Immortals (2011)
Mirror Mirror (2012)

Books
The 1990 book " by " collects her work in art direction and graphic design. A second book, " on Stage", followed in 2000.

Death
 died of pancreatic cancer in Tokyo on January 21, 2012. She married her companion Nicholas Soultanakis in hospital a few months before her death.

Legacy
Her archive has been given to UCLA Library Special Collections.

References

External links 

 The Theater. Very Parco. A poster created under Ishioka's art direction featured on Cooper Hewitt's Object of the Day blog, Smithsonian Design Museum 

1938 births
2012 deaths
Best Costume Design Academy Award winners
Deaths from cancer in Japan
Deaths from pancreatic cancer
Grammy Award winners
Japanese art directors
Japanese costume designers
Japanese graphic designers
Japanese music video directors
Women costume designers
Artists from Tokyo
Recipients of the Medal with Purple Ribbon
Tokyo University of the Arts alumni